Coralie Gladys Lassource (born 1 September 1992) is a French handball player who plays for Brest Bretagne Handball and the French national team as a left wing.

She competed at the 2015 World Women's Handball Championship in Denmark.

She became the captain of Brest Bretagne Handball when she joined the team in 2019. 

She was the captain of the French national handball team from June 2021 for the 2020 Summer Olympics during which the team won their first Olympic gold medal, until September 2022, a few months before the Euro 2022.

Her younger sister Déborah Lassource is also a professional handball player. They used to play together at Issy Paris Hand. Their mother also used to play handball.

She wears a number 10 jersey for Brest Bretagne Handball and a number 8 jersey for the national team.

Achievements

Club

International 
 EHF Champions League
 Finalist: 2021 (with Brest Bretagne Handball)
EHF Cup Winners' Cup
Runner up: 2013 (with Issy Paris Hand)

 EHF Challenge Cup
 Runner up: 2014 (with Issy Paris Hand)
 1/2 Finalist: 2014, 2015, 2016

Domestic 
 French league (Division 1 Féminine):
 Winner : 2021 (with Brest Bretagne Handball)
 Tied 1st: 2020 (with Brest Bretagne Handball)
 Runner up: 2012, 2014, 2015 (with Issy Paris Hand) and 2022 (with Brest Bretagne Handball)
 3rd: 2017 (with Issy Paris Hand)

 French Cup (Coupe de France):
 Winner : 2021 (with Brest Bretagne Handball)
 Runner up: 2014 and 2017 (with Issy Paris Hand)

 French Women's League Cup Championship (Coupe de la Ligue):
 Winner : 2013 (with Issy Paris Hand)

National team 

 Olympic Games
 2020: 

 World Championship:
 2015: 7th
 2021: 

 European Championship
 2020: 
 2022: 4th
 Junior World Championship
 2012:

Individual awards
French Championship
Hope of the Season: 2012
Best Defender: 2016
Best Left wing: 2017

World Championship 
Best Left wing: 2021

Honors 
Inducted into the Legion of Honor with the rank of Chevalier: 2021

References

External links

1992 births
Living people
French female handball players
People from Maisons-Laffitte
Sportspeople from Yvelines
Expatriate handball players
French expatriate sportspeople in Hungary
Handball players at the 2020 Summer Olympics
Medalists at the 2020 Summer Olympics
Olympic medalists in handball
Olympic gold medalists for France